Retaliate is the debut album of American death metal band Misery Index.

"Demand the Impossible" was previously recorded and released on the split with Structure of Lies.

Track listing

Personnel
Jason Netherton – vocals, bass
John "Sparky" Voyles – guitars
Matt Byers – drums
Maurizio Iacono – vocals ("Demand the Impossible")

Production
Pierre Rémillard – engineering
Jean-François Dagenais – production, engineering, mixing
Bernard Belley – mastering
Mike Harrison – layout
Tim Finn – photography

References

2003 debut albums
Nuclear Blast albums
Misery Index (band) albums